Eremophila galeata is a flowering plant in the figwort family, Scrophulariaceae and is endemic to Western Australia. It is a shrub with sticky, shiny leaves, unusual sepals, a dull pink and brown, spotted petal tube and which grows in stony red soils.

Description

There are 5 sepals which closely surround the petals and which differ greatly in size, enlarging after flowering. All the sepals are sticky and usually greenish-brown to reddish-purple. The tube is white, dull pink, yellowish-grey and pale lilac, spotted with reddish brown or purple on the inside of the petal lobes and the tube. The tube is covered with glandular hairs except for the inside of the petal lobes. The four stamens extend beyond the end of the petal tube.

Taxonomy and naming
Eremophila galeata was first formally described by Robert Chinnock in 2007 and the description was published in Eremophila and Allied Genera: A Monograph of the Plant Family Myoporaceae. The specific epithet (galeata) is a Latin word meaning "cover with a helmet" referring to the helmet-shaped sepal of the flowers of this species.

Distribution and habitat
This eremophila occurs between Leonora, Newman, Meekatharra, Wiluna and Mullewa areas in the Carnarvon, Gascoyne, Gibson Desert, Little Sandy Desert, Murchison, Pilbara and Yalgoo biogeographic regions

Conservation status
Eremophila galeata is classified as "not threatened" by the Western Australian Government Department of Parks and Wildlife.

Use in horticulture
This eremophila has attractive, large, dark green, glossy leaves but its flowers are unremarkable. It is similar to E. fraseri except that it more frost resistant than that species.

References

galeata
Eudicots of Western Australia
Plants described in 2007
Endemic flora of Western Australia
Taxa named by Robert Chinnock